Glamorous Night is a 1937 British drama film directed by Brian Desmond Hurst and starring Mary Ellis, Otto Kruger and Victor Jory. It is an adaptation of the play Glamorous Night by Ivor Novello. In a mythical European kingdom, King Stefan clashes with his prime minister and falls in love with the gypsy Melitza.

Cast
 Mary Ellis as Melitza Hjos
 Otto Kruger as King Stefan
 Victor Jory as Baron Lyadeff
 Barry MacKay as Anthony Allan
 Trefor Jones as Lorenti
 Maire O'Neill as Phoebe
 Anthony Holles as Maestro
 Charles Carson as Otto
 Felix Aylmer as Diplomat
 Finlay Currie as  Angus MacKintosh
 Raymond Lovell as  Ship's Officer

Critical reception
Sky Movies wrote, "The story creaks like a dowager's stays in this torrid tale of Ruritanian romance and skulduggery based on Ivor Novello's stage success. There are compensations, however, in the tuneful music and elegant production values, to say nothing of gipsies who appear to be addicted to ballet dancing. Victor Jory plays the villainous prime minister with steely determination and an American accent, Mary Ellis is suitably lively although she is hardly a believable Romany. Barry Mackay stands out as an English oil prospector, the role originally played on stage by Novello." Writing for The Spectator in 1937, Graham Greene gave the film a mixed review, describing it as "about as bogus as a film could be", but praising Novello's efforts to bring the film "up to date", and appreciating the photography, the camerawork, the direction, and Ellis' "daemonic good looks".

References

External links

Official legacy website of the director with filmography including Glamorous Night

1937 films
Films shot at Associated British Studios
1937 drama films
Films directed by Brian Desmond Hurst
British drama films
Films set in Europe
Films about Romani people
British black-and-white films
1930s British films